RED Air S.R.L. is a low-cost leisure airline with facilities in Las Américas International Airport, and main offices in Santo Domingo, Dominican Republic.

History
It was founded in 2020 as a joint-venture between the Venezuelan airline LASER Airlines and Dominican fixed-base operator SERVAIR Dominicana.

Destinations
As of November 2022, RED Air serves schedule flights to the following destinations:

Fleet

Current fleet

As of June 2022, RED Air operates the following aircraft:

Former fleet
RED Air formerly operated the following aircraft:

Incidents
On June 21, 2022, RED Air Flight 203 experienced a landing gear collapse. The McDonnell Douglas MD-82 (registered as HI1064) slid through a communications tower and caught fire at Miami International Airport. All 140 people on board survived. At least three people were hospitalized with reportedly-minor injuries. The aircraft has been written off as a total loss. An NTSB investigation into the cause of the accident is ongoing.

See also
List of airlines of the Dominican Republic

References

External links

Airlines established in 2020
Airlines of the Dominican Republic
Low-cost carriers